Ḥ (minuscule: ḥ) is a letter of the Latin alphabet, formed from H with the addition of a dot diacritic.

Usage
Ḥ is used to represent the voiceless pharyngeal fricative in Arabic, some Syriac languages (such as Turoyo and Chaldean Neo-Aramaic), and traditional Hebrew (whereas Ashkenazi Jews and Israelis usually pronounce the letter Ḥet as a voiceless uvular fricative). This sound also exists in the Tigrinya and Somali languages, in Modern South Arabian languages and in smaller North East African languages.

Asturian
Ḥ is used in Asturian to represent a voiceless glottal fricative (/h/) sound in Asturian words such as ḥou and ḥue, as well as some place names in the eastern part of Asturias (such as Ḥontoria and Villaḥormes).

Sanskrit
Ḥ represents visarga, the phone  in Sanskrit phonology in the International Alphabet of Sanskrit Transliteration. Other transliteration systems use different symbols.

References

See also

Dot (diacritic)
H (disambiguation)

Latin letters with diacritics
Phonetic transcription symbols